Narrabri Shire is a local government area in the North West Slopes region of New South Wales, Australia. The Shire is located adjacent to the Namoi River and the Newell and Kamilaroi Highways.

It was formed on 1 January 1981 from the amalgamation of the Municipality of Narrabri and Namoi Shire resulting from the Local Government Areas Amalgamation Act 1980.

The mayor of Narrabri Shire Council is Cr. Ron Campbell, who is an Independent.

Towns and localities
The seat of Council and major town in the Shire is Narrabri. Other towns, villages and localities in the Shire include Baan Baa, Bellata, Boggabri, Edgeroi, Gwabegar, Pilliga, and Wee Waa.

Heritage listings
The Narrabri Shire has a number of heritage-listed sites, including:
 Narrabri, Bowen Street: Narrabri Gaol and Residence

Demographics
Aboriginal and Torres Strait Islander people made up 10.7% of the population which is more than four times higher than both the national and state averages. The median age of people in the Narrabri Shire was 39 years; slightly higher than the national median of 37 years. Children aged 0 – 14 years made up 22.2% of the population and people aged 65 years and over made up 15.7% of the population. Of people in the area aged 15 years and over, half were married and 10.3% were either divorced or separated.

Between the 2001 census and the 2011 census the Narrabri Shire experienced negative population growth in both absolute and real terms. When compared with total population growth of Australia for the same periods, being 5.78% and 8.32% respectively, population growth in the Narrabri local government area was significantly lower than the national average. The median weekly income for residents within the Narrabri Shire was significantly below the national average.

At the 2011 census, the proportion of residents in the Narrabri local government area who stated their ancestry as Australian or Anglo-Saxon exceeded 88% of all residents (national average was 65.2%). In excess of 80% of all residents in the Narrabri Shire nominated a religious affiliation with Christianity at the 2011 census, which was significantly higher than the national average of 50.2%. Meanwhile, as at the census date, compared to the national average, households in the Narrabri local government area had a significantly lower than average proportion (2.3%) where two or more languages are spoken (national average was 20.4%); and a significantly higher proportion (93.6%) where English only was spoken at home (national average was 76.8%).

Council

2018 AR Bluett Award Recipient 
The Narrabri Shire Council was awarded the prestigious AR Bluett Memorial Award in 2018.

The mayor and general manager (CEO) at the time were Cr. Cathy Redding and Stewart Todd respectively.

The AR Bluett Award is awarded to the most progressive council in the state (of NSW) judged by a Trustee panel for the Award. The Award is considered as "The greatest accolade a council can achieve" and "The pinnacle of local government achievement".

Winning the Award was quite a significant achievement, as the General Manager, Stewart Todd, had only been appointed for a little over 3 years in the role and was his first appointment as a General Manager.

Current composition and election method
Narrabri Shire Council is composed of nine councillors elected proportionally as a single ward. All councillors are elected for a fixed four-year term of office. The mayor is elected by the councillors at the first meeting of the council. The most recent election was held on 22 September 2020, and the makeup of the council is as follows:

The current Council, elected in 2020, in order of election, is:

References 

 
Narrabri
Newell Highway
1981 establishments in Australia